Daniel Crainie (born 24 May 1962) is a Scottish retired association football player who played for twelve football clubs in Scotland, England, Australia and Ireland.

Crainie began his football career at Celtic where he scored seven goals and making sixteen appearances in his debut season for the Scottish club. He played only a few games in his following two seasons at Celtic before moving to England to play for Wolverhampton. Crainie made over 60 appearances for the Wolves which would be more than he would make for any other club. During his time at Wolverhampton he was loaned out to Blackpool where he made six appearances.

After a short spell at Dundee Crainie left Britain for Australia, where he played for South Melbourne. Crainie played a total of 39 times for South Melbourne, scoring ten times, more than he did at any other team.

In 1988 Crainie left Melbourne for the New South Wales coastal city of Wollongong, where he would play more than 50 games for Wollongong City and also earned himself a minor premiership with his first season at the club.

Crainie returned to the British Isles in the twilight of his career, where he played for Airdrieonians, Kilmarnock, Ballymena United, Ross County, Cork City and Bo'ness United.

References

External links

1962 births
Living people
People from Kilsyth
Association football wingers
Scottish footballers
Scotland under-21 international footballers
Celtic F.C. players
Wolverhampton Wanderers F.C. players
Blackpool F.C. players
Dundee F.C. players
South Melbourne FC players
Airdrieonians F.C. (1878) players
Kilmarnock F.C. players
Ballymena United F.C. players
Ross County F.C. players
Cork City F.C. players
Scottish Football League players
English Football League players
League of Ireland players
NIFL Premiership players
National Soccer League (Australia) players
Wollongong Wolves FC players
Bo'ness United F.C. players
Scottish expatriate sportspeople in Australia
Scottish expatriate sportspeople in Ireland
Scottish expatriate footballers
Footballers from North Lanarkshire